Toto is a Local Government Area in Nasarawa State, Nigeria. Its headquarters is in the town of Toto.

Toto falls within the western senatorial district of Nasarawa State otherwise known as Nasarawa West Senatorial District alongside Nasarawa, Keffi, Karu and Kokona Local Government Areas. Toto local government area also forms a federal constituency alongside Nasarawa local government area, and Toto covers an area of 2,903 km. The local government area is bounded to the north by the Federal Capital Territory, to the east by Nasarawa local government area, and to the south and west by Kogi State, and a population of 119,077 at the 2006 census. Toto Local Government has three districts namely Gadabuke, Toto and Umaisha. Settlements within the area include Ohizi Ogabo.

The postal code of the area is 962.

References

Local Government Areas in Nasarawa State